Alzaga is a Spanish origin surname. People with the surname include:

 Fernando Vérgez Alzaga (born 1945), Spanish bishop
 Martín de Álzaga (1755–1812), Spanish merchant and politician
 Martín de Álzaga (racing driver) (1901–1982), Argentine racing driver 
 Óscar Alzaga (born 1942), Spanish politician
 Rodolfo de Álzaga (1930–1994), Argentine racing driver

Spanish-language surnames
Spanish words and phrases